Sir Han Hoe Lim  (27 April 1894 – 23 March 1983) was a Singaporean physician and politician.

Education
Lim was educated at Chung Cheng High School, St Andrew's School, Raffles Institution before enrolling into King Edward VII College of Medicine.

He subsequently went to study medicine in the United Kingdom, graduating from the University of Edinburgh in 1918.

Career
After graduation, Lim worked at St Andrew's Hospital in Scotland for a year. He was subsequently appointed as ship's surgeon by the China Mutual Steamship Company before returning to Singapore, to start his general practice.

Lim was the chairman of the city's Straits Chinese British Association from 1930 to 1932, municipal commissioner of the Municipal Commission, a Justice of the Peace, as well as a member of numeral public bodies like the Chinese Advisory Board and the Education Committee.

Lim was appointed as an unofficial member of the Legislative Council of the Straits Settlements in 1933, becoming the council's senior Chinese unofficial member the next year, and was appointed as an unofficial member of the Executive Council of the Straits Settlements in 1940.

Lim was arrested after the fall of Singapore to the Japanese Empire in 1942. During the Japanese occupation, he was imprisoned for being accused of secretly listening to the broadcasting of the Allied nations. He was not released until the end of the Second World War in 1945.

After the war, he was appointed to the Singapore Advisory Council in June 1946 after the resignation of Wee Swee Teow, where served as an unofficial member from 1946 to 1948 and a senior unofficial member of the Executive Council of Singapore from 1948 to 1951.

In December 1947, the governor of Singapore decided to introduce income tax in Singapore, against the advice of the Singapore Advisory Council. The unofficial members of the council, including Lim, decided to resign in protest of the decision. Lim later decided not to resign and also proposed to ask the two resigned members to withdraw their resignations.

In December 1951, Lim resigned from the Executive Council of Singapore due to his deteriorating health and was replaced by Rajabali Jumabhoy.

After the war, he helped found the University of Malaya and was appointed a member of the Public Service Commission (PSC) from 1952 to 1956, serving as its chairman for less than a year in 1956.

Later in his life, he withdrew from politics as Singapore gradually gained self-governance and subsequently independence.

Honours
On 12 June 1941, Lim was made a Commander of the Order of the British Empire for public services in the Straits Settlements.

In 1946, Lim became the second Malayan Chinese to receive the honour of knighthood for public services in the Straits Settlements.

In 1951, Lim was conferred an honorary Doctor of Laws degree by the University of Malaya.

References

 "CHINESE TOPICS IN MALAYA", The Straits Times, 4 January 1935, p. 6.
 "SPECIAL REGISTRIES FOR CIVIL MARRIAGES", The Straits Times, 19 February 1940, p. 10.
 "DR. LIM HAN HOE ON "LEND FOR VICTORY"", The Straits Times, 11 September 1940, p. 11.
 Clune, Frank, High-ho to London. Angus and Robertson, 1948.
 "78 WOMEN NAMED JPs", The Singapore Free Press, 29 March 1948, p. 5.
 "Executive Council named", The Singapore Free Press, 1 April 1948, p. 5.
 "Lady Lim heads women J.P's", The Singapore Free Press, 22 April 1948, p. 5.
 "BLYTHE TO GREET GOVERNOR", The Straits Times, 19 April 1952, p. 4.
 "206 get Queen's C-Medal", The Straits Times, 7 June 1953, p. 9.
 "40 JPs ON PRISONS BOARD", The Straits Times, 19 December 1953, p. 6.
 "Marriage Law Reform", The Straits Times, 1 January 1955, p. 6.
 Yeo, Kim-wah, Political Development in Singapore: 1945–55. Singapore: NUS Press, 1973.
 Connolly, Margaret, and, Pragnell, Mervyn O., The International Yearbook and Statesman's Who's Who. Bowker British Library Kickout, 1975. 
 Yap, Pheng Geck, Scholar, Banker, Gentleman Soldier: The Reminiscences of Dr. Yap Pheng Geck. Singapore: Times Books International, 1982. 
 University of Edinburgh Journal Vols. 33–34. University of Edinburgh, 1987.
 Sandhu, Kernial Singh, and, Wheatley, Paul, Management of Success: The Moulding of Modern Singapore. Singapore: Institute of Southeast Asian Studies, 1990. 
 Likeman, Robert, Men of the ninth: a history of the Ninth Australian Field Ambulance 1916–1994. Australia: Slouch Hat Publications, 2003. 
 Khoo, Kay Kim, One Hundred Years the University of Malaya. Malaysia: University of Malaya Press, 2005. 
 Bose, Romen, The End of the War: Singapore's Liberation and the Aftermath of the Second World War. Singapore: Marshall Cavendish Editions, 2010. 
 PSC Annual Report 2010. Singapore: Singapore Public Service Commission, 2010.
 Ure, Gavin, Governors, Politics and the Colonial Office. Hong Kong: Hong Kong University Press, 2012.  
 Saw, Swee Hock, The Population of Singapore. Singapore: Institute of Southeast Asian Studies, 2012.
 "Portrait of Mr. Lim Han Hoe, President of Straits Chinese British Association", BookSG. Singapore: Singapore Government, retrieved on 3 May 2014.
 "Portrait of Mr. Lim Han Hoe, President of Singapore Chinese Football Association", BookSG. Singapore: Singapore Government, retrieved on 3 May 2014.
 "About the History of the Peranakan Association", The Peranakan Association, Singapore, retrieved on 3 May 2014.
 "List of British Honours to the Overseas Chinese in the Straits Settlements and British Malaya", Overseas Chinese in the British Empire, retrieved on 3 May 2014.
 "Han Hoe Lim", ancestry.com, retrieved on 3 May 2014.
 "Historical Development of Parliament", Parliament of Singapore, retrieved on 3 May 2014.
 Kua, Bak Lim, 新華歴史人物列傳 (Biographies of Singapore Chinese Historical Figures). Education Publishing Private Limited, 1995.

External links
 The Peranakan Issue 4, 2010

1894 births
1983 deaths
Singaporean people of Hokkien descent
Singaporean politicians
20th-century Singaporean physicians
Alumni of the University of Edinburgh
Raffles Institution alumni
Commanders of the Order of the British Empire
Knights Bachelor